Penrhos is a village in the community of Whitecastle in Monmouthshire, south east Wales, United Kingdom.

Location

Penrhos is located three miles north of Raglan.

History and amenities

Penrhos has an old Norman motte and bailey castle site. Penrhos sits on a tributary stream of the River Trothy.

The parish church St Cadoc's Church, Penrhos, is dedicated to Saint Cadoc  and is a grade II* listed building. Penrhos is also home to the Tibetan Buddhist retreat, Lam Rim Buddhist Centre, which is open to both practising Buddhists and visitors.

References

External links
 Website for Penrhos Village, Monmouthshire
 Castle Wales on Penrhos castle site
 Kelly's 1901 Directory of Monmouthshire on Penrhos
 

Villages in Monmouthshire
Castles in Monmouthshire